Supermen of Malegaon (Malegaon Ka Superman) is a 2012 Hindi documentary film written and directed by Faiza Ahmad Khan. This documentary was released on 29 June 2012 in cinemas.

Cast
 Sameer khan
 Imand Shaik
 badshah khan
 Akram Khan
 Shafique
 Nasir Sheikh

Plot
Supermen of Malegaon revolves around the passion which residents of Malegaon, a city in Maharashtra India, have for film making. The town is fraught with communal tensions, poverty and hardship. To get away from all this, residents of Malegaon take to making spoofs on Bollywood movies. This documentary is a journey through that movie making process.

Production

Supermen of Malegaon (Malegaon Ka Superman) was never meant to be released as a movie and was originally made as a documentary for a Singapore TV channel.

The documentary is set in the city of Malegaon in Maharashtra, India. The movie was shot over seven months in 2008.

Release
The film was released on 29 June 2012 in cinemas.

Reception
Supermen of Malegaon had mostly very positive reviews. 
 "Supermen of Malegaon is independent documentary filmmaking at its most heartfelt, most sincere, and most enjoyable," writes Preeti Arora on rediff. 
 "At roughly 65 minutes it's brisk, enjoyable, and will have you smiling from ear to ear," wrote Masand on CNN-IBN. 
 "Superman of Malegaon is the celebration of the inherent fantasy of any average human being who dreams of being either a star or a star-maker, irrespective of their eligibility." wrote Gaurav Malani on Times of India. 
 "There’s not a single dull moment in Supermen of Malegaon" wrote Blessy Chettiar on DNAIndia.
 "The most touching line comes from the writer who says that no one fathoms the pain of the writer. The writer imagines and conceives the movie investing so much of his being.  But only 20% of what he conceives makes it to the film and he has to suffer eternally the pain of not being able to share the rest."

Awards
 Jury Award for Best Documentary at Asiatica Film Mediale, Rome 
 Jury Award for Best Documentary at Kara Film Festival, Pakistan 
 Best Debut Film at Film South Asia, Nepal
 Best Editing, Documentary and Director at the Asian Festival of First Films, Singapore
 Best Editing at the Asian TV Awards, Singapore
 Audience Choice Award for Documentary, Indian Film Festival of Los Angeles (IFFLA) 
 Golden Camera Award for Best Documentary, US International Film and Video Festival
 Gold Awards for Editing and Best Documentary and a Silver Award for Sound Design, Indian Documentary Producers Association
 Best Documentary at Bollywood and Beyond, Stuttgart
 Youth Choice Award at Vesoul Asian Film Festival
 Special Mention at Best Film Festival, Romania

References

External links
 

2012 films
Films scored by Sneha Khanwalkar
Indian documentary films
Films shot in Maharashtra
Films scored by Hitesh Sonik
Superman in other media
2012 documentary films